Mission Trail Athletic League (MTAL) was a high school athletic conference part of the CIF Central Coast Section of the California Interscholastic Federation.  It comprised high schools generally around Monterey County, California, with schools from southern Santa Clara County, Santa Cruz County and one of only two high schools in San Benito County.  Not all schools participated in all sports. In 2017, Mission Trail Athletic League merged with the Monterey Bay League (MBL) to create the Pacific Coast Athletic League (PCAL).

Historical Members
 Anzar High School
 Carmel High School	
 Gonzales High School
 Greenfield High School
 King City High School	
 Georgiana Bruce Kirby Preparatory School
 Marina High School
 Oakwood School	
 Pacific Collegiate School
 Pacific Grove High School
 Pacific Point Christian Academy	
 Palma High School
 Santa Catalina School
 Soledad High School	 
 Stevenson School
 Trinity Christian High School
 York School

References

CIF Central Coast Section